Wes Fuller may refer to:

Wes Fuller, a witness at the O.K. Corral hearing and aftermath
Wes Fuller, a character in Dominion (TV series), American television series